= Eswatini National Badminton Championships =

The Eswatini National Badminton Championships, formerly known as the Swaziland National Badminton Championships, is a tournament organized by the Eswatini Badminton Association to crown the best badminton players in Eswatini.

== Past winners ==
Year	Men's singles	Women's singles	Men's doubles	Women's doubles	Mixed doubles
1997–2007	No data				
2008	Dinani Vilakati	Nomcebo Maseko	Simon Maseko; Dinani Vilakati	Nomcebo Maseko; Gugu Dlamini	Simon Maseko; Nomcebo Maseko
2009	Dinani Vilakati	Nomcebo Maseko	No competition		
